The Never List is a 2020 American coming-of-age drama film directed by Michelle Mower, starring Fivel Stewart, Keiko Agena, Andrew Kai, Anna Grace Barlow, Ryan Cargill, Brenna D'Amico and Jonathan Bennett.

Cast
 Fivel Stewart as Eva Jeffries
 Keiko Agena as Jennifer Jeffries
 Andrew Kai as Joey
 Anna Grace Barlow as Taylor
 Ryan Cargill as Ben Hallster
 Brenna D'Amico as Liz
 Jonathan Bennett as Mr. Snyder
 Matt Corboy as Paul Jeffries
 Tori Keeth as Izzi
 Susan Ziegler as Mrs. Carlton
 Kevin Menkhorst as Chuck
 Drew Droege as Principal Greer
 Sam M. Hall as Dev
 Kimberly Stanphill as Carol Mears
 Booboo Stewart as Lead Singer
 Rob Nagle as Liz's Dad
 Gloria Bigelow as Olivia
 MariNaomi as herself

Release
The film was released in select theatres on 11 December 2020.

Reception
Dan Lybarger of the Arkansas Democrat-Gazette wrote that the film's acknowledgement that the "chemical recreation" the characters engage in "sometimes has catastrophic consequences in the real world" keeps the film from becoming a "shallow diversion".

Cary Darling of the Houston Chronicle rated the film 3 stars out of 5 and wrote that "where the film ultimately goes may not be totally unexpected but getting there is an engaging trip."

Barbara Shulgasser-Parker of Common Sense Media rated the film 2 stars out of 5 and wrote that while Stewart is "compelling", she "cannot inject sense into the insensible."

Liam Trump of Film Threat gave the film a score of 2/10 and wrote that the film suffers from a "poor" screenplay and "tepid" direction, and that "any of the potential drawn up by the premise is drowned out by how weak the execution winds up being."

References

External links
 
 

American coming-of-age drama films
2020s coming-of-age drama films